Multiwebcast, founded in 2000, is a Montreal, Quebec-based company which provides asynchronous webcast services for conference organizers and professional associations around the world. Multiwebcast also operates under the legal names of E-Med Hosting, Multi-assessment and the Multilearning Group.

History

Multiwebcast began its operation under the name of E-MedHosting.com Inc; it acquired its expertise in the continuing medical education domain (the name is still legally used). One of their first product was CMEonHIV.com (launched in 2000), online CME presentations on HIV for healthcare professionals given by international experts.

The company continued its expansion by launching CMEonDiabetes.com the same year, providing CME conferences given by international experts in endocrinology, insulin resistance, prediabetes, metabolic syndrome and Type 2 diabetes.

The following years, the company launched a series of CME websites in the field of Hemophilia, Transplantation, Sleep Disorders, Prostate Health, ADHD.

In 2003, the company was involved in the first major online education activity for Canadian Physicians during the SARS breakout in Canada in 2003. Dr. Don Low, chief microbiologist at Toronto's Mount Sinai hospital, was halfway through a precautionary 10-day quarantine at his home when he gave a lecture that E-MedHosting published and translated in French within 24h for the Canadian Medical Association (CMA).

In 2004, the company launched the first website fully dedicated to the research on C-reactive protein and the JUPITER trial, CRPhealth.com. Thanks to the involvement of Dr. Paul Ridker and other renowned experts in the field, the website was featured by many media online. Its General Public portal explain in non-scientific vocabulary the implication of the CRP in detection of heart attack.

In 2005, the company launched a series of CME websites in Australia geared towards Australian Specialists and General Practitioners.

In 2006, Multiwebcast announced its first long-term webcast services contract  with The European Association for the Study of the Liver (EASL).

Since then Multiwebcast offers its webcast services to many conference organizers (Kenes, Eurocongress, KIT) and professional associations (EASL, EAES, EACS, SGO, IGCS, ESGO, ESC, EPA, EPA, EHA, ESPR, WSO, and others)

Recently, the company became an authorized accredited provider of the Royal Australian College of General Practitioners (RACGP)

Products 

Based on the Multiwebcast's website, their main product is the Adobe Flash-based Multiwebcast Platform. Services are offered in English, Spanish, German and French.

References

External links
MULTIWEBCAST website

Companies based in Montreal
Online companies of Canada
Companies established in 2000